Ef'al may refer to:

Ef'al Regional Council, a defunct regional council in Israel.
Ef'al, a defunct kibbutz which became the Ramat Ef'al neighbourhood of Ramat Gan.